John Gascoigne was an English lawyer and author.

Life
Gascoigne was a member of the University of Oxford and became a doctor of canon law. In that capacity he was called to give evidence before a commission of five bishops, appointed 20 June 1376 to examine controversies between the masters of arts and the faculty of law at Oxford. In 1381 he appears among the signatories of the judgment of William Berton, chancellor of the university, condemning the doctrine of John Wycliffe touching the Eucharist.

Works
John Pits (De Angliæ Scriptoribus, p. 540), credited him with the authorship of a book Contra Wiclevum. There has also been attributed to him a life of St. Jerome, which is really the work of Thomas Gascoigne, and a lost Lectura de Officio et Potestate Delegati.

References

Attribution

14th-century births
14th-century English lawyers
Canon law jurists
Year of death unknown
English male writers